Labdia anarithma is a moth of the family Cosmopterigidae. It was described by Edward Meyrick in 1888. It is found in New Zealand and throughout Australia. Adults are on the wing from December to March and are day flying. They have been collected by sweeping bracken fern.

Taxonomy 
This species was first described by Edward Meyrick in 1889 and named Proterocosma anarithma. In 1897 Meyrick placed this species within the genus Pyroderces.  This species was then placed in the genus Labdia in 1927 by A. Jefferis Turner. This placement was confirmed in 1996 in the Checklist of Australian Lepidoptera. The lectotype specimen, collected in New Plymouth by Meyrick, is held at the Natural History Museum, London.

Description
Meyrick first described this species as follows:

Distribution
This species is native to both New Zealand and Australia. In New Zealand this species has been observed in Taranaki, Napier. Palmerston North, Masterton, Wanganui and Wellington.

Behaviour 

The adults of this species are on the wing from December until March and are day flying. George Hudson stated he had collected them by sweeping bracken fern in the late afternoon.

References

Moths described in 1889
Labdia
Moths of New Zealand
Moths of Australia
Taxa named by Edward Meyrick